Baleshed (also Baleshed Landing and  Stack Landing) is a ghost town in Issaquena County, Mississippi, United States. Baleshed was located on the Mississippi River.

Baleshed was established on land which had been granted to Stephen Duncan in 1833.  The town was named for a shed located there where bales of cotton were stored prior to shipping.

Baleshed had a post office, and a population of 24 in 1900. The post office operated under the name Baleshed from 1888 to 1917.

In 2000, an extant stone vault used to store money remained there.

References

Former populated places in Issaquena County, Mississippi
Mississippi populated places on the Mississippi River
Ghost towns in Mississippi